Shahid Sarlashkar Yasini Expressway is a new expressway in Tehran. It runs along Tehran-Damavand Highway to reduce traffic in the highway.

Expressways in Tehran